Angeh Fam (also Romanized as Angeh Fām; also known as Angefām, Angeqām, and Angetām) is a village in Farim Rural District, Dodangeh District, Sari County, Mazandaran Province, Iran. At the 2006 census, its population was 58, in 16 families.

References 

Populated places in Sari County